is a railway station in Uonuma, Niigata, Japan, operated by East Japan Railway Company (JR East).

Lines

Station layout
The station consists of one ground-level side platform  serving a single bi-directional track. The station is unattended.

History 
The station was absorbed into the JR East network upon the privatization of the JNR on April 1, 1987.

Surrounding area
Kamijō Post Office
Sumon Onsen
Kamijō Elementary School

See also
 List of railway stations in Japan

References

External links
  Kamijo Station (JR East)

Railway stations in Niigata Prefecture
Stations of East Japan Railway Company
Railway stations in Japan opened in 1951
Tadami Line